Sannur Cave was discovered in the 1980s after blasting in a quarry created an entrance.

It is a limestone cave overlaid with alabaster created by thermal springs. Its unique geology and beautiful formations of stalactites and stalagmites led it to being recognized as a Protected Area in 1992.

References

External links 
 Ministry of Environment Egyptian Environmental Affairs Agency - Natural Protectorates Description

National parks of Egypt
Caves of Egypt
Parks in Egypt
Nature conservation in Egypt